Potassium ethoxide, also known as potassium ethanolate, is an off-white or yellow powder with the chemical formula of C2H5KO. Potassium ethoxide contains an ethoxide ion, the conjugate base of ethanol, which makes this compounds strongly basic. It hydrolyzes to yield ethanol and potassium hydroxide.

Uses
Potassium ethoxide is used as a strong base, similar to sodium and potassium methoxides, and potassium tert-butoxide. Catalytic amounts of potassium ethoxide in ethanol can be used to perform transesterification reactions that yield ethyl esters. Sodium or potassium ethoxide is also a suitable base for the malonic ester synthesis where diethyl malonate is used, since any transesterification reaction does not result in ester scrambling.

Safety
Potassium ethoxide is stable, but also both flammable and corrosive. The compound reacts vigorously with water. If the compound comes into contact with damp air, it may lead to the heating and ignition of the solid powder. It must be kept separated from air, moisture, water, acids, oxidizing agents, and reducing agents. It can also cause severe skin burns.

References

Ethoxides
Potassium compounds